Oboro may refer to:

Fiction 
 Oboro, a character in manga and anime series Gintama
 Oboro, a character in the novel The Kouga Ninja Scrolls
 Oboro (Utawarerumono), a  character in the series Utawarerumono
 Oboro (Spriggan), a character in the manga series Spriggan
 Oboro, a character in the SNES role-playing game Live A Live
 Oboro clan, a fictional clan in the video game series Shinobi
 Oboro Bishamon, a character from the Darkstalkers video game series

Other uses 
 Oboro (Nigeria), a clan in Abia State, Nigeria
 Oboro Station, a railway station in Akkeshi, Hokkaidō, Japan
 , two destroyers of the Imperial Japanese Navy